Half-Life E.P. is an EP released by Local H in 2001. It was released as a teaser for their album Here Comes the Zoo, which included the title track. The other songs include two covers, "Static Age" by The Misfits and "25 or 6 to 4" by Chicago, and a b-side, "Stick to What You Know".

Track listing
 "Half-Life" (Scott Lucas, Brian St. Clair) – 3:39
 "Static Age" (Glenn Danzig) – 2:42
 "25 or 6 to 4" (Robert Lamm) – 3:51
 "Stick to What You Know" (Scott Lucas, Brian St. Clair) – 2:41

Personnel
 Scott Lucas – vocals, guitar, bass
 Brian St. Clair – drums

References

2001 EPs
Local H EPs
Palm Pictures EPs
albums produced by Jack Douglas (record producer)